Historical Records was an American independent record label, set up in 1965 by Arnold S. Caplin.

Historical Records re-issued rare blues, gospel, jazz and country recordings of the 1920s.

See also
 List of record labels

External links
 Illustrated Historical Records discography

Defunct record labels of the United States
Blues record labels